Middlebury station is an Amtrak train station in Middlebury, Vermont. The station opened on July 29, 2022 when the Ethan Allen Express was extended from Rutland to Burlington.

History 

Middlebury's historic train station closed in 1953 when the Rutland Railroad discontinued passenger service to the town. The building is now private property and houses retail space.

Since 2014, Vermont Translines has run intercity motorcoach service from Albany to Burlington up the U.S. Route 7 corridor through Middlebury. The company later joined the Amtrak Thruway network, adding train connections at Albany–Rensselaer station. The Middlebury bus stop is located close to Davis Family Library at Middlebury College.

Planning and construction 
In plans to build a new station, the Vermont Agency of Transportation (VTrans) assumed responsibility for constructing a 300-foot-long-by-12-foot-wide platform, 200-foot canopy, wheelchair lift, and lighting, while the town covered land acquisition, parking, access roads, landscaping, and amenities. A station house has not been planned.

In April 2018, the Town of Middlebury hired the engineering firm VHB to study potential sites for a new train platform. By September 2018, VHB had presented four sites for public consideration. Middlebury eventually selected the cheapest and most popular option: a site across the tracks from the historic train station that required no additional property acquisition.

In February 2021, VTrans announced that Kubricky Construction Corporation of Waterbury had been hired to build the platform and canopy, and that work would begin in the summer once the downtown bridge project was complete. Construction was well underway by July 2021, and was expected to be finished by August 31. The on-site inspector said the structure was built to last for 100 years. Workers discovered and removed old water and sewer pipes during the excavation.

Once the platform was in place, the town hired Munson Earth Moving to construct parking facilities. The plan called for 17 parking spaces, though Middlebury's planning director said overflow parking might be needed if train ridership is high. The town also invested in new sidewalks, crosswalks, and curbing to better connect the station to Riverfront Park, Middlebury College, and downtown businesses.

By November 2021, the station as a whole was said to be nearing completion. The total cost was estimated at $665,000, with VTrans paying $250,000 and Middlebury paying the rest.

By April 2022, train service was announced to begin in July. The Vermont chapter of Operation Lifesaver worked to raise railroad safety awareness in Middlebury ahead of the station's opening.

Downtown rail tunnel 
In conjunction with restoring passenger train service to Middlebury, the Main Street and Merchant's Row bridges over the rail line needed to be addressed. VTrans and Middlebury had replaced the 100-year-old bridges with temporary spans in 2017 following an emergency closure. In summer 2020, the roads were closed for ten weeks while a  rail tunnel was constructed. The new tunnel has an additional  of clearance, accommodating double-stack rail cars. It also created new public space in Triangle Park next to St. Stephen's Episcopal Church. The first train went through the tunnel on September 18, 2020, as part of a reopening celebration.

Due to the bridge's proximity to Otter Creek, additional drainage had to be added. The project delayed construction on the Middlebury station, and with it the entire Burlington extension project, as the Middlebury station's platform ended where the grade to a new  tunnel began.

The project was completed within budget at a cost of $91.5 million: $72 million for construction, $14.8 million for right-of-way, $4.4 million for engineering, and $300,000 for utility relocation. All costs were shared by Vermont and the Federal Highway Administration. The COVID-19 pandemic was said to have caused delays, but not increased costs. The community liaison for the project, Jim Gish, posted weekly updates for over four years.

References

Further reading

External links 

Amtrak stations in Vermont
Railway stations in the United States opened in 2022
Former Rutland Railroad stations